Mishkeh (also Romanized as Mīshkeh; also known as Mīsheh) is a village in Aliyan Rural District, Sardar-e Jangal District, Fuman County, Gilan Province, Iran. At the 2006 census, its population was 83, in 21 families.

References 

Populated places in Fuman County